Robert Bloom (January 15, 1946 – February 28, 1974) was an American singer-songwriter. He is known best for being a one-hit wonder with the 1970 song, "Montego Bay", which was co-written with and produced by Jeff Barry.

Biography
Bloom was born in Brooklyn, NY. He graduated from Wantagh High School in 1964. In the early 1960s, while still in his teens, Bloom had been a member of the doo-wop group, The Imaginations. He received a big break in 1969 when he was awarded a contract to write and record a jingle for Pepsi, paving the way for his later success with "Montego Bay". He also played a role as a songwriter for the Kama Sutra/Buddah group of labels, co-writing "Mony Mony" for Tommy James and the Shondells and, with Jeff Barry, "Sunshine" for The Archies. Bloom co-wrote songs with Jeff Barry and Neil Goldberg for the Monkees' album Changes and their 1971 single "Do It in the Name of Love". He often recorded demos of his songs at the recording studio of MAP City Records, owned by friends Peter Anders and Vincent "Vini" Poncia Jr., with chief engineer Peter H. Rosen at the controls. Early solo projects included "Love Don't Let Me Down" and "Count on Me".

The recordings that followed his success with "Montego Bay" in 1970, "Heavy Makes You Happy", which became a hit for the Staple Singers in 1971, "Where Are We Going" and The Bobby Bloom Album all used the same combination of pop, calypso, and rock.

Death
Having suffered from depression toward the end of his life, Bloom died on February 28, 1974, in an accidental shooting at his home in Hollywood, at the age of 28.

Bloom had accidentally shot himself while cleaning his gun. The surviving members of Bloom's family did not believe Bloom would have shot himself, and the investigation never followed up on leads. Jeff Barry learned later he was the sole beneficiary of Bloom's life insurance policy. In a 1995 interview, Jeff Barry states that Bobby Bloom was shot by another guy in a fight over a girl. He states that Bloom burst into a room after kicking down a door and was then shot. The case was never followed up.

Discography

Albums
 1970 The Bobby Bloom Album (L&R Records) US#126
 1971 Where Are We Going (Buddah)

Singles

See also
 List of 1970s one-hit wonders in the United States

References

1945 births
1974 deaths
20th-century American singers
20th-century American male singers
American male pop singers
American male singer-songwriters
Polydor Records artists
Buddah Records artists
Kama Sutra Records artists
MGM Records artists
Accidental deaths in California
Firearm accident victims in the United States
Deaths by firearm in California
American singer-songwriters